Matthew Stillman (born 28 September 1967) is the British CEO and founder of 2020 Group (also known as 2020 Content). The group owns 20 companies in 16 countries, operating under seven brands.

Companies in the group have produced films such as Casino Royale, Mission Impossible 4, Chronicles of Narnia and The Bourne Identity; music videos for Beyonce, Kanye West, David Bowie and Madonna.; and commercials for clients including Adidas, Google, Guinness and Audi.

In 2000, The Hollywood Reporter named Stillman in its International Power 50 list of the fifty "biggest power players" in global entertainment and media.

Early life and education 
Stillman grew up in Richmond, south-west London. His father imported products from China, while his mother worked for Air France at Heathrow Airport. He has two siblings. He was educated at University College School, London, and the University of Sussex, where he studied politics, graduating in 1991.

Career

Early career 
After unsuccessfully trying to break into the film industry in London, Stillman visited Prague in 1992 with a friend, Nick Spikings, to explore the possibility of setting up a production company in the city. Beginning with "$500 and a typewriter" and renting an office at Barrandov Studios for $150 a month, the two friends set up a company called Stillking. They then started a nightclub, Ubiquity, to provide cash-flow over the company's first summer.

Stillking 
Stillman won Stillking's first business working on a music video for k.d. lang, then produced a TV commercial for Dentsu. More work on TV commercials followed. In 1994, Stillman chose an unknown Czech film student, Ivan Zachariáš, to make a film about UN peace-keepers for a 50th anniversary commercial for the UN. The project marked a breakthrough for both Stillking and Zachariáš.

By 1995, Stillking was working on around ninety commercials a year. Film-makers were coming to Prague in large numbers, attracted by the combination of low costs, attractive locations and high production standards, and over the next decade the company thrived and expanded. Offices were in due course opened in Warsaw, London, Budapest (Pioneer Stillking), Bucharest (Icon Stillking), Milan, Barcelona, Cape Town and Santiago de Chile. By 1999 the company was turning over around $20m a year and by 2002 about $168m.

In 1995, Stillking made its first network mini-series: The Ring, for NBC, starring Nastassja Kinski, was released in 1996. The same year Stillking worked on its first feature film, Plunkett & Macleane (released 1999) with Working Title Films.  Stillking subsequently set up its own development arm for producing its own English-language films.

The company has become one of Europe's most significant production entities, participating in over 150 film and TV projects, including Casino Royale, The Bourne Identity, Van Helsing, Red Sparrow, Wanted, Carnival Row and The Witcher.

It has also continued to produce music videos, including work for Beyonce, Kanye West and Madonna; and commercials for clients such as Guinness, Audi, Coca-Cola, Mercedes and Stella Artois.

In 1997, the American heiress Elisabeth Goth purchased a minority stake in the company (reportedly 20 per cent) for an undisclosed sum.

Stink 
In 1997, Stillking combined with the production company Blink Ltd to create Stink, a London-based venture that produces TV commercials. Stink went on to receive numerous awards for its work, including more than 100 Cannes Lions, more than 50 D&AD pencils and the first ever Film Grand Prix for an interactive piece of work. Its clients have included Honda, Gucci, Apple, Nike and Facebook.

2020 Group 
In 2014 the Stillking Films holding company was renamed 2020 Group. The group, which is sometimes referred to as 2020 Content, now has 20 daughter companies, in 16 countries, and is one of the largest private companies involved in the production of content in advertising, film and television. Stillman is founder and CEO.

On The Corner Films 
In 2017 Stillman became a director of On The Corner Films, a company specialising in documentaries and factual entertainment, with Asif Karpadia and James Gay Rees. Its productions include Diego Maradona (2019).

Illuminated Content 
In 2018, in collaboration with Liev Schreiber, Stillman launched Illuminated Content, a Gotham-based venture to develop, produce and finance TV and movie projects. In 2019 the company produced Human Capital, and announced a collaboration with David Carver to produce The Place I Belong, a biopic of the golfer Moe Norman.

Other activities 
Stillman is a member of the British Academy of Film and Television Arts (Bafta). He is a member of Founders Forum, the community for global entrepreneurs, CEOs, and investors in the digital, media and technology sectors. 

Stillman was one of 1,280 British business leaders who signed a letter backing Britain Stronger In Europe on the eve of the UK's 2016 referendum on EU membership.

In 2000 The Hollywood Reporter named Stillman in its International Power 50 list of the "biggest power players" in global entertainment and media.

Filmography (selected)

Personal life 
In 2004, Stillman married Katherine Driver, a manager and producer who is sister of the actress Minnie Driver. They live in London.

Stillman enjoys cycling and appreciates the clothes of designers such as Acne and John Pearse. The fashion website Mr Porter includes him in its Style Council, a directory of "the world’s best connected men". Stillman is a director of the Czech cancer charity, the Pink Bubble Foundation.

References

External links 
Matthew Stillman at British Film Institute
Matthew Stillman at IMDB
Stillking Films official website
Stink official website

1967 births
Living people
British company founders